Blue is a 2009 Indian Hindi-language action-adventure film co-written and directed by Anthony D'Souza, and produced by Dhilin Mehta under Shree Astavinayak Cine Vision Limited. The film stars Sanjay Dutt, Akshay Kumar, Lara Dutta, and Zayed Khan in lead roles, whilst Katrina Kaif stars in a cameo appearance. Kylie Minogue appears in a musical number in the film. Blue was released during the Diwali festival on 16 October 2009 and received mixed to a positive response from critics. During the time of release, it was the most expensive Hindi-language film until then, produced with a budget of more than $25 million. Loosely based on the Hollywood film Into the Blue (2005) and its sequel Into the Blue 2: The Reef (2009), Blue failed to recover its high budget from the box office.

Plot
An opening sequence shows a famous ship, Lady in Blue, sinking in a storm, and the captain emerging alone on the seashore.

Aarav runs a successful fishing company called Blue Fisheries in the Bahamas. Sagar works as a diver for Aarav's company. Sagar plans to marry his girlfriend Mona. Sagar's younger brother Sam meets Nikki, a female biker who actually works for underworld gangster Gulshan. Sam defeats Gulshan in a bike race, and asks Nikki out for dinner. Gulshan asks Sam to work for him, but Sam refuses unless there's a large sum of money involved.

Nikki explains to Sam that the job would pay $50,000. Gulshan hires Sam, but is actually set up by Gulshan and ends up costing Gulshan $50 million. Sam does not have the money, and doesn't think Gulshan will find him in the Bahamas. Sam arrives at Aarav's company and Sagar welcomes him happily. However, in the Bahamas, Sam is confronted by Gulshan and chased by his crew. Aarav saves Sam's life.

Sam tells Aarav what he did, Aarav tells Sagar about the situation. Sam tries to convince Sagar to retrieve the treasure from Lady in Blue. Sagar refuses. Gulshan bombs Sagar's home, and kidnaps Mona, with a ransom of $50 million or Sam for her return. Sam decides that they need to go and rescue Mona as they already killed Nikki. They decide to find the treasure, pay off Gulshan and use the rest of the money to live comfortably. Sagar is still hesitant and it is revealed that Sagar has a haunted and shocking past with Lady in Blue. Years ago, Sagar had to abandon his archaeologist father, Aadesh Singh, on the ship, to save his own life. Sagar finally agrees to help.

The three of them bring the treasure up and find that Gulshan and his gang have steered up next to their ship. He reveals that Aarav hired Gulshan to do all of this. Aarav jumps into the ocean after killing Gulshan, and the trio are forced to leave Aarav there, Sagar vowing never to come back to Lady in Blue.

Three months later, Sagar gets a call from Aarav. Aarav survived his leap into the ocean, and reveals to them that his grandfather was Captain Jagat Malhotra, the traitorous captain of the ship, Lady in Blue, who committed suicide after he was court-martialed. His motive to find the treasure was to bring honor back to his family name. Nikki is revealed to be alive and that her real name is Nikita Malhotra, Aarav's wife. The film ends with Aarav and Nikki cuddling on one of Aarav's boats as the end credits begin.

Cast
Sanjay Dutt as Sagar "Sethji" Singh
Akshay Kumar as Aarav Malhotra
Zayed Khan as Sameer "Sam" Singh
Lara Dutta as Mahima "Mona" Singhania
Rahul Dev as Gulshan Samnani
Kabir Bedi in a special appearance as Jagat Sudhir Malhotra, Aarav's grandfather
Katrina Kaif in a special appearance as Nikita "Nikki" Malhotra
Kylie Minogue in a guest appearance as herself in the song "Chiggy Wiggy"

Music

The music of the film was composed by A. R. Rahman with lyrics provided by Abbas Tyrewala, Mayur Puri, Rajat Arora, Raqeeb Alam and Sukhwinder Singh. The music was promoted and digitally distributed by Hungama Digital Media Entertainment Pvt. Ltd.

 
The song "Chiggy Wiggy" was sung by pop singer Kylie Minogue and Sonu Nigam. Backing female vocals is given by Suzanne D'Mello and Phij Adams did the sound mixing for the song. Minogue also made a special appearance in the video of the song.

The track "Aaj Dil Gustakh Hai", which begins with a sequence of Sukhwinder Singh's humming, followed by an acoustic guitar loop presents Shreya Ghoshal handling a westernised rendition. The backing vocalists for the song are Benny Dayal, Hentry Kuruvila, Shi Millhouse and Raven Millhouse. "Fiqrana" features vocals by Vijay Prakash and Shreya Ghoshal and was picturised as solo performances of Akshay Kumar, Lara Dutta and Zayed Khan. Sanjay Dutt, the actor playing the film's protagonist boycotted the promotional events since he was not included in this song, which remained chart-topper for many weeks. "Bhoola Tujhe" is a romantic song sung by Rashid Ali. The Yeri voice for the song was by Kavita Belliga. The theme song for Blue was sung by Blaaze, with backing vocals by Raqeeb Alam, Sonu Kakkar, Jaspreet Jasz, Neha Kakkar & Dilshad Khan. "Rehnuma" was sung by Shreya Ghoshal and Sonu Nigam. "Yaar Mila Tha" was sung by Udit Narayan and Madhushree with backing vocals by Ujjayinee Roy, Shi Millhouse and Raven Millhouse. This track was not included in the film, but it is conceptualised as a song played out between the characters of Akshay and Katrina after the end of the film's plot when they talk about Zayed's character.

The official track listing:

Album reception

The soundtrack of the movie has received positive reviews. bollywoodhungama reviewed the music saying "Blue is a good album and has all in it to make a good impression at the music stands. In a way, the album comes at just the right time when there is quite some variety in store this Diwali. Blue practically mixes up genres..."

Reception

Critical reception
The film received mixed reviews from critics. Anupama Chopra of NDTV called the movie an 'smartly crafted underwater thriller', criticizing and at the same time praising the performance and the cast and the script. Taran Adarsh of Bollywood Hungama gave the movie a positive review, praising the star cast and action scenes and gave the film 4 stars out of 5.

Sequel
The directors announced their intentions to make a sequel titled  Aasman.

See also

References

External links

2009 films
2000s Hindi-language films
2000s action adventure films
Treasure hunt films
Films scored by A. R. Rahman
Indian action adventure films
Underwater action films
Indian remakes of American films
Warner Bros. films
Films set in the Bahamas
Films shot in the Bahamas